Ostrowsko may refer to:

 Ostrowsko, Lesser Poland Voivodeship, Poland
 Ostrowsko, Łódź Voivodeship, Poland